Partan bree is a seafood soup speciality from north-eastern Scotland, where much of the country's fishing fleet is based. Its name derives from its ingredients, partan being the Gaelic and Scots for crab and bree a Scots term for soup (lit. brew). Crab and rice are used as main ingredients.

See also
She-crab soup
 List of soups

References

Scottish cuisine
Scottish soups
British seafood dishes